Gilletiodendron is a genus of plants in the family Fabaceae. 

Species accepted by the Plants of the World Online as of February 2021:
Gilletiodendron escherichii 
Gilletiodendron glandulosum 
Gilletiodendron kisantuense 
Gilletiodendron mildbraedii 
Gilletiodendron pierreanum

References

Detarioideae
Fabaceae genera
Taxonomy articles created by Polbot